Kraljev Vrh may refer to:

 Kraljev Vrh, Jakovlje, a village in Zagreb County, Croatia
 Kraljev Vrh, Preseka, a village in Zagreb County, Croatia
 Kraljev Vrh, Primorje-Gorski Kotar County, a village near Čabar, Croatia